Lisięcice  is a village located in the Opole Voivodeship (southern Poland), Głubczyce County, Gmina Głubczyce.

Monuments 
The following monuments are listed by the Narodowy Instytut Dziedzictwa.
 kościół par. pw. Podwyższenia Krzyża, z XV w., 1667 r., 1812 r
 15th century Parish church.
 zagroda nr 61
 Historic homestead.
 zagroda nr 72
 Historic homestead.
 zagroda nr 171, z poł. XIX w.
 Historic homestead from the 19th century.

Gallery

References

Villages in Głubczyce County